This is the list of members of the 12th Lok Sabha, (10 March 1998 – 26 April 1999) after the 1998 Indian general election held during February–March 1998. This was the second consecutive Lok Sabha, like the 11th Lok Sabha elections that did not provide the country with a stable government. Atal Bihari Vajpayee became the 16th Prime Minister of India but the government lasted for only about thirteen months due to no clear mandate. Also, the party was not able to get support from other parties, after the withdrawal of support by AIADMK. After his resignation, then President K. R. Narayanan asked Sonia Gandhi, the leader of the opposition in the Lok Sabha to form the government; however, Gandhi responded that the UPA would not be able to form a government at the center, following which President Narayanan dissolved the House. The next General elections of 1999 for 13th Lok Sabha provided India a stable government that lasted for full five years. Nine sitting members from Rajya Sabha, the Upper House of Indian Parliament, were elected to 12th Lok Sabha after the 1998 Indian general election.

Important members

List of members by political party

List of members by state 

The list of members as published by the Election Commission of India:

Andhra Pradesh

Arunachal Pradesh

Assam

Bihar

Goa

Gujarat

Haryana

Himachal Pradesh

Jammu & Kashmir

Karnataka

Kerala

Madhya Pradesh

Maharashtra

Manipur

Meghalaya

Mizoram

Nagaland

Orissa

Punjab

Rajasthan

Sikkim

Tamil Nadu

Tripura

Uttar Pradesh

West Bengal

Andaman & Nicobar Islands

Chandigarh

Dadra & Nagar Haveli

Daman & Diu

National Capital Territory of Delhi

Lakshadweep

Pondicherry

References

External links 

 
Terms of the Lok Sabha
1998 establishments in India
1999 disestablishments in India